Rap guanine nucleotide exchange factor 2 is a protein that in humans is encoded by the RAPGEF2 gene.

RAPGEF2 is a cyclic AMP binding protein.

Function 

Members of the RAS subfamily of GTPases function in signal transduction as GTP/GDP-regulated switches that cycle between inactive GDP- and active GTP-bound states. Guanine nucleotide exchange factors (GEFs) such as RAPGEF2 serve as RAS activators by promoting acquisition of GTP to maintain the active GTP-bound state and are the key link between cell surface receptors and RAS activation.

Interactions 

RAPGEF2 has been shown to interact with RAP1A and RALGDS.

References

Further reading